Santa Barbara Cemetery is a cemetery located at 901 Channel Drive in Santa Barbara, California. Founded in 1867, it serves as a nonsectarian cemetery.

Notable interments
 Heather Angel (1909–1986), actress
 Peter J. Barber (1830–1905), architect
 Christopher Bernau (1940–1989), actor
 Scott Cordelle Bone (1860–1936), politician
 Stephen W. Burns (1954–1990), actor
 Walter Capps (1934–1997), politician
 Sabin Carr (1904–1983), pole vaulter
 Curtis H. Castle (1848–1928), politician
 Virginia Cherrill (1908–1996), actress
 Eric Christmas (1916–2000), actor
 Ronald Colman (1891–1958), actor
 Jeanne Crain (1925–2003), actress
 Bradford Dillman (1930–2018), actor
 Leslie Fenton (1902–1978), actor and director
 Norman Gimbel (1927–2018), songwriter
 Al Gionfriddo (1922–2003), baseball player
 Pierpont M. Hamilton (1898–1982), U.S. Air Force general
 Haji (1946–2013), actress
 Domino Harvey (1969–2005), bounty hunter and model
 Laurence Harvey (1928–1973), actor
 Byron Haskin (1899–1984), director
 William Welles Hollister (1818–1886), rancher and entrepreneur
 Tab Hunter (1931–2018), actor
 John Ireland (1914–1992), actor
 Murray Kinnell (1889–1954), actor
 George Owen Knapp (1855–1945), industrialist and philanthropist
 William Lassiter (1867–1959), U.S. Army major general
 Walter F. Lineberger (1883–1943), politician
 Katherine MacDonald (1891–1956), silent-film actress and producer
 Eddie Mathews (1931–2001), baseball player
 John McLiam (1918–1994), actor
 Charles A. Ott Jr. (1920–2006) U.S. Army major general
 Fess Parker (1924–2010), actor
 Suzy Parker (1932–2003), model and actress
 Donald C. Peattie (1898–1964), scientist
 Herb Peterson (1919–2008), American Inventor
 Vera Ralston (1923–2003), figure skater and actress
 Peggy Rea (1921–2011), actress
 Jheri Redding (1907–1998), hairdresser and chemist
 Mark L. Requa (1866–1937), mining engineer and conservationist
 Kenneth Rexroth (1905–1982), poet
 Marguerite Roberts (1905–1989), screenwriter
 George Rowe (1894–1975), actor
 John Sanford (1904–2003), author and screenwriter
 George Washington Smith (1876–1930), architect and painter
 Thomas M. Storke (1876–1971), politician
 Alan Thicke (1947–2016), singer and actor
 Norma Varden (1898–1989), actress

References

Cemeteries in California
1867 establishments in California